Elachista leucofrons is a moth of the family Elachistidae. It is found in the United States, where it has been recorded from Maine, Ohio, North Carolina, California, Colorado and New Mexico. The habitat consists of low-lying deciduous forests.

The wingspan is 9–10 mm. The forewings are blackish, slightly irrorated (sometimes forming faint whitish lines). The hindwings are dark blackish brown. Adults have been recorded on wing in February, May and August, depending on the location. There is one generation per year.

The larvae feed on Elymus canadensis, Elymus virginicus and Hystrix species (including Hystrix patula). They mine the leaves of their host plant. The mine on Elymus species starts near the tip of the leaf, extending downward and broadening to the width of the leaf. Mining larvae can be found from late February to mid-April. The larvae are pale grayish or greenish, with a narrow whitish mid-dorsal and broad whitish lateral lines.

References

leucofrons
Moths described in 1920
Moths of North America